Japan competed in the 2017 Asian Winter Games in Sapporo and Obihiro, Japan from February 19 to 26. This marked the fourth time the country has played host to the Asian Winter Games. Japan competed in all eleven disciplines from five sports. Ice hockey player Go Tanaka was the country's flagbearer during the parade of nations at the opening ceremony.

Medal summary

Medal table

Medalists

Competitors
The following table lists the Japanese delegation per sport and gender.

Alpine skiing

Japan's alpine skiing team will consist of eight athletes (four men and four women). The team was announced on January 19, 2017.

Men
Naoki Yuasa
Hideyuki Narita
Yohei Koyama
Tatsuki Matsumoto

Women
Emi Hasegawa
Mio Arai
Asa Ando
Emiko Kiyosawa

Biathlon

Men
Junji Nagai
Mikito Tachizaki
Yuuki Nakajima
Tsukasa Kobonoki
Kosuke Ozaki
Takuto Terabayashi

Women
Fuyuko Tachizaki
Yurie Tanaka
Rina Mitsuhashi
Sari Furuya
Asuka Hachisuka
Kirari Tanaka

Cross-country skiing

Japan's cross-country skiing team will consist of eight athletes (four men and four women). The team was announced on January 19, 2017.

Men
Akira Lenting
Nobuhito Kashiwabara
Naoto Baba
Kohei Shimizu

Women
Yuki Kobayashi
Hikari Miyazaki
Chisa Obayashi
Kozue Takizawa

Curling

Japan has entered both a men's and women's teams.

Men's tournament

Japan's men's curling team consists of five athletes.

Yusuke Morozumi – skip
Tetsuro Shimizu – third
Tsuyoshi Yamaguchi – second
Kosuke Morozumi – lead
Koshuke Hirata – alternate

Round-robin
Japan has a bye in draw 3

Draw 1 
Saturday, February 18, 9:00

Draw 2
Saturday, February 18, 18:00

Draw 4
Monday, February 20, 13:30

Draw 5
Tuesday, February 21, 9:00

Draw 6
Tuesday, February 21, 18:00

Semifinals
Wednesday, February 22, 1:30

Gold medal match
Friday, February 24, 1:30

Women's tournament

Satsuki Fujisawa – Skip
Mari Motohashi – Third
Chinami Yoshida – Second
Yurika Yoshida – Lead
Yumi Suzuki – Alternate

Round-robin
Japan has a bye in draw 3

Draw 1 
Saturday, February 18, 13:30

Draw 2
Saturday, February 19, 9:00

Draw 4
Monday, February 20, 18:00

Draw 5
Tuesday, February 21, 13:30

Figure skating

Japan's figure skating team consists of twelve athletes. On February 7, 2017, it was announced that Kaori Sakamoto would replace Satoko Miyahara, because the latter had sustained an injury to her hip.

Singles

Mixed

Freestyle skiing

Japan's freestyle skiing team will consist of eight athletes (four men and four women). The team was announced on January 19, 2017.

Men
Sho Endo
Daichi Hara
Ikuma Horishima
Kosuke Sugimoto

Women
Miki Ito
Arisa Murata
Kisara Sumiyoshi
Hinako Tomitaka

Ice hockey

Japan as the host nation has entered teams in both hockey tournaments. The men's team will compete in the top division.

Men's tournament

Japan was represented by the following 23 athletes:

Yutaka Fukufuji (G)
Yuto Ito (G)
Takuto Onoda (G)
Yosuke Haga (D)
Ryo Hashiba (D)
Ryo Hashimoto (D)
Keigo Minoshima (D)
Kazumasa Sasaki (D)
Hiroto Sato (D)
Takafumi Yamashita (D)
Maruru Furuhashi (D)
Yushiroh Hirano (F)
Takuma Kawai (F)
Shuhei Kuji (F)
Masahito Nishiwaki (F)
Daisuke Obara (F)
Kenta Takagi (F)
Seiji Takahashi (F)
Hiromichi Terao (F)
Yuri Terao (F)
Go Tanaka (F)
Hiroki Ueno (F)
Takuro Yamashita (F)

Legend
G– Goalie D = Defense F = Forward

Women's tournament

Japan was represented by the following 21 athletes:

Yurie Adachi
Yoshino Enomoto (F)
Moeko Fujimoto (F)
Nana Fujimoto (G)
Mika Hori (D)
Akane Hosoyamada (D)
Tomomi Iwahara (F)
Shiori Koike (D)
Mai Kondo (G)
Akane Konishi (G)
Hanae Kubo (F)
Ami Nakamura (F)
Shoko Ono (F)
Chiho Osawa (F)
Sena Suzuki (D)
Aina Takeuchi (D)
Naho Terashima (F)
Ayaka Toko (D)
Haruka Toko (F)
Rui Ukita (F)
Haruna Yoneyama (F)

Legend: G = Goalie, D = Defense, F = Forward

Short track speed skating

Japan's speed skating team consists of 10 athletes (five men and five women). The team was officially unveiled on January 9, 2017.

Men
Keita Watanabe
Ryosuke Sakazume
Kazuki Yoshinaga
Hiroki Yokoyama
Takayuki Muratake

Women
Moemi Kikuchi
Hitomi Saito
Sumire Kikuchi
Ayuko Ito
Aoi Watanabe

Ski jumping

Japan's ski jumping team will consist of four athletes (all men, as women's events are not scheduled to be held). The team was announced on January 19, 2017.

Men
Yukiya Satō
Naoki Nakamura
Masamitsu Itō
Yūken Iwasa

Snowboarding

Japan's snowboarding team will consist of ten athletes (four men and six women). The team was announced on January 19, 2017.

Men
Ayumu Nedefuji - halfpipe
Shinnosuke Kamino - slalom/giant slalom
Yuya Suzuki - slalom/giant slalom
Takumi Miyazawa - slalom/giant slalom

Women
Hikaru Oe - halfpipe
Haruna Matsumoto - halfpipe
Kurumi Imai - halfpipe
Sena Tomita - halfpipe
Eri Yanetani - slalom/giant slalom
Asa Toyoda - slalom/giant slalom

Speed skating

Japan's speed skating team consists of 20 athletes (ten men and ten women). The team was officially unveiled on January 15, 2017.

Men
Takuro Oda - 1000 m, 1500 m 
Shota Nakamura - 1500 m, 1000 m, TP MS
Ryosuke Tsuchiya - 5000 m, 10000 m, TP MS
Shane Williamson  1500 m, 5000 m, 10000 m, TP, MS
Seitaro Ichinohe  5000 m, 10000 m, TP (sub) 
Taro Kondo 1500 m 
Yuto Fujino 500 m, 1000 m 
Tsubasa Hasegawa 500 m 
Shunsuke Nakamura  500 m, 1000 m 
Yuma Murakami 500 m

Women
Nao Kodaira 500 m, 1000 m 
Miho Takagi 1000 m, 1500 m, 3000 m, TP, MS
Mai Kiyama 5000 m 
Misaki Oshigiri 1500 m, 3000 m, TP 
Nana Takagi 1,500 m, TP, MS
Ayano Sato 500 m, 1500 m, 3000 m, MS
Arisa Go 500 m, 1000 m 
Maki Tabata 5000 m 
Maki Tsuji 500 m, 1000 m 
Fuyo Matsuoka 5000 m

References

Nations at the 2017 Asian Winter Games
Asian Winter Games
Japan at the Asian Winter Games